Flight 139 may refer to:

 Air France Flight 139, hijacked on 27 June 1976
 Braathens SAFE Flight 139, hijacked on 21 June 1985
 Sudan Airways Flight 139, crashed on 8 July 2003

0139